Samuel Dakin (12 April 1808 – 27 December 1876) was an English first-class cricketer active 1840–55 who played mostly for MCC or The North. He was born in Sileby; died in Cambridge. Dakin was a right-handed batsman, a medium pace roundarm bowler and an occasional wicketkeeper who played in 45 matches. He scored 834 career runs with a highest score of 64; held 22 catches; completed one stumping; and took 35 wickets with a best return of four for 3.

References

1808 births
1876 deaths
English cricketers
Cambridge Town Club cricketers
Manchester Cricket Club cricketers
Married v Single cricketers
Marylebone Cricket Club and Metropolitan Clubs cricketers
Marylebone Cricket Club cricketers
Midland Counties cricketers
Non-international England cricketers
North v South cricketers
Nottinghamshire cricketers
Players cricketers
United All-England Eleven cricketers
People from Sileby
Cricketers from Leicestershire
West of England cricketers
Nicholas Felix's XI cricketers
Over 36 v Under 36 cricketers